Altstätten Stadt railway station is a railway station in Altstätten, in the Swiss canton of St. Gallen. It is the eastern terminus of the  Altstätten–Gais line and is served by local trains only. 

It is located in the center of the town. The railway station Altstätten SG is an intermediate stop on the  Chur–Rorschach line with additional local and long-distance services.

Services 
Altstätten Stadt is served by the S24 of the St. Gallen S-Bahn:

 : hourly service to Gais.

References

External links 
 
 Altstätten Stadt station on SBB

Railway stations in the canton of St. Gallen
Appenzell Railways stations
Altstätten